Eritreans in Italy are residents of Italy who were born in Eritrea or are of Eritrean descent. According to the United Nations, there were 13,592 Eritrean migrants in Italy in 2015.

History

Italy has had a connection with Eritrea since the acquisition of Assab in 1869 by Raffaele Rubattino. Eritrea officially became an Italian colony in 1889. Prior to the racial laws of Fascist Italy, mixed race children of Italian fathers and Eritrean mothers were entitled to Italian citizenship, as long as they were legally recognized by their fathers. Since Eritrea's independence, Italy has become a destination for Eritrean migrants and asylum seekers.

Demographics
As of 2021, most Eritrean nationals residing in Italy live in Rome, Milan, and Bologna. The following table lists Italian provinces by Eritrean population.

Notable people
Melissa Chimenti
Elvira Banotti
Alessandro Ghebreigziabiher
Gabriella Ghermandi
Ines Pellegrini
Senhit (singer)

See also
Demographics of Eritrea
Eritreans

References

Eritrean diaspora